Ullal or  Uḷḷāla is a City Municipality at Mangalore, educational, commercial & industrial hub in Dakshina Kannada district. It is located 
10 km from the Mangalore City centre. Ullal City Municipality along with the Mangalore City Corporation forms the continuous Mangalore urban agglomeration area which is currently the fourth biggest in Karnataka after Bangalore, Mysore and Hubli-Dharwad. There is also a planning to merge Ullal City Municipality & some gram panchayats along with Mangalore City Corporation to form the Greater Mangalore region. Ullal is one of the oldest towns in India. In the 15th century it came under the rule of the Portuguese. Still the remains of its glorious history can be seen in the beaches and other parts of Ullal.

It is a town about 8–10 km south of Pumpwell, a major junction in Mangalore & close to the border between the two southern states of Karnataka and Kerala. The Mangalore International Airport is 24 km away from Ullal. It comprises two revenue divisions, Ullal and Permannur, in Mangalore taluk. Ullal is adjacent to City Corporation of Mangalore, 10 km from District headquarters – Mangalore. It is the part of the Mangalore urban agglomeration area. It is developing rapidly with many premium educational institutes and commercial centres. Most of the people in Ullal belong to either Beary or Mogaveera ethnic group.

It is very famous for historic locations like Sayyid Muhammad Shareeful Madani Darga , Sri Cheerumba Bagavathi Temple , Someshwara Temple, Someshwar Beach, Kadapara jara Darga, Summer Sands Beach Resort, Queen Abbakka Chowta's Fort at Ranipura, K Pandyarajah Ballal Institutes and college of nursing, St. Sebastian Church Permannur, Sayyid Madani Institutions, Fish Meal & Oil Plant, and Queen Abbakka's Jain temple at Melangadi.

This quaint little sea town on the shore of Arabian Sea was the setting for wide-scale sea-erosion that occurred in the late 1990s and early this millennium. The local authorities, however, have tried to reduce the damage by placing sand bags near the advancing coastline, the benefits of this step are yet to be noted. Adjacent to summer sands beach resort is subhash nagar. The remains of Rani Abbakka's fort can be seen in the vicinity of Someshwara Temple.

Ullal is the first "Kerosene Free" city in the state of Karnataka.

This town is an important trading centre for fish and fish manure. Fishing and Beedi rolling are main occupations of the residents of this town.

History

This town was the subsidiary capital of the Chowta rulers and was ruled by Jain Queen, Abbakka Chowta in the middle of the 16th century.

Abbakka Chowta of Ullal can perhaps be proclaimed the first promoter of women's liberation. A regular firebrand, the people of Ullal look upon her with much pride. A Jain princess of 16th century, she came to the throne on the death of her sister. She was married to the King of Mangalore, but the marriage was not a success. In a few years the couple was estranged with the queen returning to her beloved Ullal. The reason for the grouse was, the queen was averse to the payment of subsidy demanded by the Portuguese. While her husband continued to be subservient to them, the queen was openly rebellious. Relations between the royal couple steadily worsened and finally ended with divorce, with the queen returning all the jewels to her ex-husband. War was declared and the queen was captured while on a sailing expedition on the Nethravathi. Taken prisoner she was presented before her husband. However, on this one occasion the queen thought discretion the better part of valour and with all her womanly charms got the Banga Arasa (King) to set her free and return all her lands to her. The Raja went so far as to avow his eternal friendship to her. But hardly had she reached the precincts of her own kingdom then she vowed to wage war on her husband once more.

For this she sought the help of the powerful Raja of Bednore. The Banga Raja had meanwhile enlisted the help of the Portuguese to subjugate his wife. The Raja of Bednore being an opportunist was only too ready to enter the fray. The Banga-Portuguese alliance was defeated with the Banga Fort razed to the ground. The queen had to part with the fertile tract of land at Berdatte to the Bednore King for his support.

Having successfully defeated her husband, the queen now turned her attention to the Portuguese with whom she maintained her unconciliatory attitude. Several punitive expeditions were sent against her, which she repulsed successfully with the help of the Zamorin of Calicut. Another expedition sent under João Peixoto in 1566 ended in disaster for the Portuguese. The queen along with Chennappa Mogaveera (Gurikara) as commander-in-chief and Mogaveera warriors she surrounded the Portuguese frigate at night. She took them by surprise and inflicted a crushing defeat on them. Incensed by the defeat made all the more insulting at the hands of a woman, the Portuguese sent a veritable armada under the leadership of the Portuguese Governor himself. While the queen met with initial success, she was betrayed, so some say, by her own people for a casket of silver. However, the army of the queen was thoroughly outnumbered. What ensured was a bloody massacre with the queen escaping to the hills, a fugitive. Another version has it that the queen had killed herself rather than give herself up to the enemy which really seems more in keeping with her character.

Pietro Della Valle, a renowned traveller and historian of the 16th century, seems to have been fascinated by her. Her militant nature aroused his interest and he made several attempts to meet her. His efforts finally met with success when he accidentally came across her in the bazaar. His foreign mein and dress elicited her interest and with the aid of an interpreter, courtesies were exchanged and an invitation issued to visit the royal palace.

Della Valle was enamoured of "her perfect dignity, handsome feature and exemplary assiduity. Active and vigorous in actions of war and weighty affairs. Even at night she was not free to take rest but dispensed justice to her people." His description of her is at once romantic and realistic. He puts her age down at 40, dark complexioned and with elegant figure. At another instance, he says she could be mistaken for a common kitchen wench, but for her graceful and judicious speech. Her scanty clothing of only a loincloth may have created this impression. He seems highly impressed with her administrative qualities and doesn't give much credence to the rumours of her having poisoned her elder two sons, who were aspiring to the throne.

One can see the ruins of the fort she built around Somanatheshwara temple. This temple houses few things related to the Abbakka Chowta. There is an old Jain temple (basadi) in the town which belonged to the queen. Ullal was one of the major ports of the western coast in the pre-colonial era.

Civic Administration 
Ullal City Municipality is the second biggest Governing body after Mangalore City Corporation in Mangalore Urban Agglomeration.

Ullal was formed as a Nagara Panchayat in 1996. Later Town Municipal Council was formed in 2006. And was then upgraded to City Municipality in 2014.

Geography
It has an average elevation of 5 metres (16 ft).

Climate

Work Profile
Out of total population, 20,979 were engaged in work or business activity. Of this 14,766 were males while 6,213 were females. In census survey, worker is defined as person who does business, job, service, and cultivator and labour activity. Of total 20979 working population, 96.19% were engaged in Main Work while 3.81% of total workers were engaged in Marginal Work.

Demographic

According to 2011 Census, Muslims form 56.10%, Hindus form 34.48% and Christians form 9.34% of the Population.

Population of Children with age of 0–6 is 6278 which is 11.68% of total population of Ullal (CMC). In Ullal City Municipal Council, Female Sex Ratio is of 1025 against state average of 973. Moreover, Child Sex Ratio in Ullal is around 944 compared to Karnataka state average of 948. Literacy rate of Ullal city is 92.87% higher than state average of 75.36%. In Ullal, Male literacy is around 96.42% while female literacy rate is 89.45%.

Ullal City Municipal Council has total administration over 9,588 houses to which it supplies basic amenities like water and sewerage. It is also authorize to build roads within City Municipal Council limits and impose taxes on properties coming under its jurisdiction.

Schedule Caste (SC) constitutes 1.67% while Schedule Tribe (ST) were 0.49% of total population in Ullal (CMC).

Media
Ullal based local television channels include Posa Kural News, Abbakka TV, CCN TV, STAR OF KUDLA CCN LIVE, CCN NEWS, DAIL TV etc.

In music world, Ullal is famous for its own rapper Mustafa Ullal. A 33-year-old rapper and a father of two has garnered 12,000 subscribers on his YouTube channel as of March 2019. With sarcastic overtones on communalism, divisive politics and fake news, this Maikala based beary rapper's potshots on issues and concerns is a force to be reckoned with. Back in 2015, he had recorded 'Idhadi Zohra' a beary language song he had written to the beats of rap legend Eminem's 'Cleanin Out my Closet'.

See also
 Rani Abbakka of Ullal
 Thokottu
 U. T. Khader
 Ullal City Municipal

External links
 City of Ullal
 Master Plan Map of Ullal by Mangalore Urban Development Authority
 Sayyid Muhammad Shareeful Madani Darga
 Summer Sand Beach Resort Ullal
 Ullal upgraded to City Municipality
 Human Development Index of Dakshina Kannada District
 Mangalore Urban Agglomeration Population

References

Localities in Mangalore
Cities and towns in Dakshina Kannada district